Rivera-Bironico railway station is a railway station in the Swiss canton of Ticino and municipality of Monteceneri. The station takes its name from the nearby villages of Rivera and Bironico, and is on the original line of the Swiss Federal Railways Gotthard railway between Bellinzona and Lugano. This line has been by-passed by the Ceneri Base Tunnel since 2020, and most trains between Lugano and Bellinzona now use the base tunnel rather than passing through Rivera-Bironico station. Just to the north of the station, the line enters the original high-level Monte Ceneri Tunnel.

Services 
 the following services stop at Rivera-Bironico:

References

External links 
 
 

Railway stations in Ticino
Swiss Federal Railways stations